Aemilius Asper, Latin grammarian, possibly lived in the 1st century AD or late 2nd century AD.

Works
Aemilius Asper wrote commentaries on Terence, Sallust and Virgil dealing with content and form, and including parallels with other authors. Numerous fragments of the commentary on Virgil show that as both critic and commentator he possessed good judgment and taste. They are printed in Keil, Probi in Vergilii Bucolica Commentarius (1848); see also Suringar, Historia Critica Scholiastarum Latinum (1834); Grafenhan, Geschichte der klassischen Philologie im Alterthum, iv (1843–1850).

Two short grammatical treatises, extant under the name of Asper, and of very little value, have nothing to do with the commentator, but belong to a much later date; the time of Priscian (6th century). Both are printed in Keil, Grammatici Latini.

Aelius Donatus is thought to have borrowed freely from Asper.

Notes

References

 That refers to Schanz, Geschichte der romischen Litteratur, sect. 598.

External links
Corpus Grammaticorum Latinorum: complete texts and full bibliography

Grammarians of Latin
Silver Age Latin writers
1st-century Romans
2nd-century Romans
1st-century writers
2nd-century writers
Asper